L'histoire en 16/9 is Nâdiya's first music DVD. The DVD came with a bonus CD. 2 months after its release, it was certified platinum by SNEP, meaning over 300,000 copies were sold of the DVD.

Features
DVD
Video documentary "L'histoire" – 41:43
Biography – 6:15
The Making of Nâdiya – 30:38
"Parle-moi" [music video] – 4:06
"Et c'est parti..." [music video] – 3:53
"Si loin de vous" [music video] – 4:07
"Signes" [music video] – 3:40
"Chaque fois" [music video] – 4:55
"J'ai confiance en toi" [music video] – 3:50
Photo gallery – 4:30
Teaser of Nâdiya – 4:24
Link to Official website

Bonus CD
"Lady Marmalade (Voulez vous coucher avec moi?)" – 
"What a Feeling (Flashdance)" – 4:12
"Parle-moi" [6mondini remix] – 5:00
"Et c'est parti..." [6mondini remix] – 4:59
"Si loin de vous" [6mondini remix] – 5:33
"Signes" [6mondini remix] – 6:00
"Megamix" ("Parle-moi", "Et c'est parti...", "Si loin de vous", "Signes") – 3:57

References

Nâdiya video albums